Omicron (uppercase Ο, lowercase ο) is the 15th letter of the Greek alphabet. This letter is derived from the Phoenician letter ayin: . In classical Greek, omicron represented the close-mid back rounded vowel  in contrast to omega which represented the open-mid back rounded vowel  and the digraph ου which represented the long close-mid back rounded vowel . Letters that arose from omicron include Roman O and Cyrillic O. The word literally means "little O" (o mikron) as opposed to  "great O" (ō mega). In the system of Greek numerals, omicron has a value of 70.

Use
In addition to its use as an alphabetic letter, omicron is occasionally used in technical notation, but its use is limited since both upper case and lower case (Ο ο) are indistinguishable from the Latin letter "o" (O o) and difficult to distinguish from the Arabic numeral "zero" (0).

Mathematics

The big-O symbol introduced by Paul Bachmann in 1894 and popularized by Edmund Landau in 1909, originally standing for "order of" ("Ordnung") and being thus a Latin letter, was apparently viewed by Donald Knuth in 1976 as a capital Omicron, probably in reference to his definition of the symbol (capital) Omega.  Neither Bachmann nor Landau ever call it "Omicron", and the word "Omicron" appears just once in Knuth's paper: in the title.

Greek numerals

There were several systems for writing numbers in Greek; the most common form used in late classical era used omicron (either upper or lower case) to represent the value 70.

More generally, the letter omicron is used to mark the fifteenth ordinal position in any Greek-alphabet marked list. So, for example, in Euclid's Elements, when various points in a geometric diagram are marked with letters, it is effectively the same as marking them with numbers, each letter representing the number of its place in the standard alphabet.

Astronomy
Omicron is used to designate the fifteenth star in a constellation group, its ordinal placement an irregular function of both magnitude and position. Such stars include Omicron Andromedae, Omicron Ceti, and Omicron Persei.

In Claudius Ptolemy's Almagest, tables of sexagesimal numbers    are represented in the conventional manner for Greek numbers:
 . Since the letter omicron [which represents  in the standard system] is not used in sexagesimal, it is re-purposed to represent an empty number cell. In some copies, zero cells were just left blank (nothing there, value is zero), but to avoid copying errors, positively marking a zero cell with omicron was preferred, for the same reason that blank cells in modern tables are sometimes filled-in with a long dash (—). Both an omicron and a dash imply that "this isn't a mistake, the cell is actually supposed to be empty". By coincidence, the ancient zero-value omicron resembles a modern Hindu-Arabic zero ().

Medicine 

The World Health Organization (WHO) uses the Greek alphabet to describe variants of concern of SARS‑CoV‑2, the virus which causes COVID-19. On November 26, 2021, Omicron was assigned to the B.1.1.529 variant of concern.

History

In the earliest Greek inscriptions, only five vowel letters A E I O Y were used. Vowel length was undifferentiated, with O representing both the short vowel /o/ and the long vowels /o:/ and /ɔː/. Later, in classical Attic Greek orthography, the three vowels were represented differently, with O representing short /o/, the new letter Ω representing long /ɔː/, and the so-called "spurious diphthong" OY representing long /o:/.

Although the Greeks took the character O from the Phoenician letter `ayin, they did not borrow its Phoenician name. Instead, the name of the letter O in classical Attic times was simply the long version of its characteric sound:  (pronounced /o:/) (that of Ω was likewise ).
By the second and third centuries CE, distinctions between long and short vowels began to disappear in pronunciation, leading to confusion between O and Ω in spelling.

Mispronunciation
Many people mispronounce Omicron as “Omnicron” due to the unfamiliarity of the letter, and the use of “Omni-“ in many words.

Character encodings
 Greek omicron / Coptic O

 Mathematical omicron

These characters are used only as mathematical symbols. Stylized Greek text should be encoded using the normal Greek letters, with markup and formatting to indicate text style.

Footnotes

References

External links 
 
 

Greek letters
Vowel letters